Wildenmannlisloch (also Wildmannlisloch, translating to "wild man's hole")  is an alpine limestone Karst cave
in the municipality of  Wildhaus-Alt St. Johann,  Toggenburg region, canton of St. Gallen, Switzerland, on the northern slope of the Churfirsten range (ca. 2 km due north of peak Selun) at an elevation of 1640 m.

The cave extends for 142 m, at about 60 m from the entrance forming a chamber.
The cave's name is recorded in 1819 a booklet on "Zwingli's birthplace" (Zwinglis Geburtsort, i.e. Wildhaus) by J. Fr. Franz: "at the foot of Selun ridge there is a great cave, known as the wild man's hole, which at first is very broad and high, so that it could by entered by horse and wagon, then becomes narrower, and again wider, and in such alternation continues along various bends for a quarter of an hour before its end is reached."
An examination of 15 July 1906 yielded bones of cave bears. A more detailed survey was conducted during 1923 to 1928 (published in Bächler 1934), producing a large number of bones, mostly of bears, besides a smaller number of stone tools comparable to the Wildkirchli finds. The bones seem to have been artificially deposited in heaps. The cave was presumably in use (either inhabited or used as a storage site for meat, or as a  sacrificial site) by prehistoric man during the Mousterian (about 40,000 to 35,000 years ago).

Johannes Seluner, a feral child found in 1844, presumably lived in the cave during a number of years.

References 

 
Emil Bächler, Das Wildenmannlisloch Am Selun (1934)
 Aus der Geschichte von Alt St. Johann (wildhaus-altstjohann.ch)

1906 archaeological discoveries
Caves of Switzerland
Limestone caves
Appenzell Alps
Toggenburg
Mousterian